Fesenkov may refer to:

Vasily Fesenkov, an astrophysicist; and things named for him:
2286 Fesenkov, a main-belt asteroid
Fesenkov (lunar crater)
Fesenkov (Martian crater)